Larry Holmes (born November 3, 1949) is an American former professional boxer who competed from 1973 to 2002 and was world heavyweight champion from 1978 until 1985. He grew up in Easton, Pennsylvania, which led to his boxing nickname of the "Easton Assassin".

Holmes' left jab is often rated among the best in heavyweight boxing history. In addition to holding the WBC heavyweight title from 1978 to 1983, 
Holmes held the Ring magazine and lineal heavyweight titles from 1980 to 1985 and the inaugural IBF heavyweight title from 1983 to 1985.

Holmes won his first 48 professional bouts, including victories over Ken Norton (the man he defeated in 1978 for the WBC championship), Muhammad Ali, Earnie Shavers, Mike Weaver, Gerry Cooney, Tim Witherspoon, Carl Williams, and Marvis Frazier. Holmes fell one short of matching Rocky Marciano's career record of 49–0 when he lost to Michael Spinks in a 1985 upset. Holmes retired after losing a rematch to Spinks the following year but made repeated comebacks. He was unsuccessful in four further comeback attempts (against Mike Tyson in 1988, Evander Holyfield in 1992, Oliver McCall in 1995 and Brian Nielsen in 1997) to regain the heavyweight title. Holmes fought for the final time in 2002, at age 52, against the 334lb Eric "Butterbean" Esch and ended his career with a record of 69 wins and 6 losses, with all of his losses coming in world title fights.

Holmes is frequently ranked as one of the greatest heavyweights of all time and has been inducted into both the International Boxing Hall of Fame and World Boxing Hall of Fame. He is the only boxer to have defeated Muhammad Ali by stoppage and the last living boxer to have defeated Ali.

Early life
Holmes was the fourth of twelve children born to John and Flossie Holmes. The family moved to Easton, Pennsylvania in the Lehigh Valley region of eastern Pennsylvania in 1954. Holmes' father went to Connecticut, where he visited the family every three weeks and worked as a gardener there until his death in 1970. "He didn't forsake us", said Flossie Holmes. "He just didn't have anything to give." The family survived on welfare. To help support his family, Holmes dropped out of school when he was in the seventh grade and went to work at a car wash for $1 an hour. He later drove a dump truck and worked in a Lehigh Valley quarry.

Amateur career
Holmes began boxing at age 18. In his twenty-first bout, he boxed Nick Wells in the semifinals of the 1972 National Olympic Trials in Fort Worth, Texas. Wells, a southpaw known for unprecedently high knockout-to-win percentage for an amateur boxer, with a majority of knockouts coming in the first round, stopped Holmes in the first round. Nevertheless, Holmes was chosen by a selection committee of the National Olympic authorities to fight at the Olympic box-offs in West Point, New York, where he had a match-up versus Duane Bobick. Holmes was dropped in the first round with a right to the head. He got up and danced out of range, landing several stiff jabs in the process. Bobick mauled Holmes in the second round but could not corner him. The referee warned Holmes twice in the second round for holding. In the third, Bobick landed several good rights and started to corner Holmes, who continued to hold. Eventually, Holmes was disqualified for excessive holding.

Professional career

Early years
After compiling an amateur record of 19–3, Holmes turned professional on March 21, 1973, winning a four-round decision against Rodell Dupree. Early in his career he worked as a sparring partner for Muhammad Ali, Joe Frazier, Earnie Shavers, and Jimmy Young. He was paid well and learned a lot. "I was young, and I didn't know much. But I was holding my own sparring those guys", Holmes said. "I thought, 'hey, these guys are the best, the champs. If I can hold my own now, what about later?'"

Holmes first gained credibility as a contender when he upset the hard-punching Earnie Shavers in March 1978. Holmes won by a lopsided twelve-round unanimous decision, winning every round on two scorecards and all but one on the third. Holmes's victory over Shavers set up a title shot between Holmes and WBC Heavyweight Champion Ken Norton in Las Vegas on June 9, 1978.

Defeating Norton and winning WBC heavyweight championship

The fight between Holmes and Ken Norton was a tough, competitive fight. After fourteen rounds, each of the three judges scored the fight dead even at seven rounds each. Holmes rallied late in the fifteenth to win the round on two scorecards and take the title by a split decision.

In his first two title defenses, Holmes easily knocked out Alfredo Evangelista and Ossie Ocasio. His third title defense was a tough one. On June 22, 1979, Holmes faced future WBA Heavyweight Champion Mike Weaver, who was lightly regarded going into the fight sporting an uninspiring 19–8 record. After ten tough rounds, Holmes dropped Weaver with a right uppercut late in round eleven. In the twelfth, Holmes immediately went on the attack, backing Weaver into the ropes and pounding him with powerful rights until the referee stepped in and stopped it. "This man knocked the devil out of me", Holmes said. "This man might not have had credit before tonight, but you'll give it to him now."

Three months later, on September 28, 1979, Holmes had a rematch with Shavers, who got a title shot by knocking out Norton in one round. Holmes dominated the first six rounds, but in the seventh, Shavers sent Holmes down with a devastating overhand right. Holmes got up, survived the round, and went on to punish Shavers in the eleventh round and the referee stopped the fight .

His next three defenses were knockouts of Lorenzo Zanon, Leroy Jones, and Scott LeDoux.

Defeating Ali

On October 2, 1980, at Caesars Palace in Las Vegas, Holmes defended his title against Muhammad Ali, who was coming out of retirement in an attempt to become the first four-time world heavyweight champion. Holmes dominated the 38-year-old Ali, winning every round on all three judges' scorecards. At the end of the tenth round, Ali's trainer stepped in to stop the fight as Holmes was inflicting major blows on Ali, handing Ali the only stoppage defeat of his career. After the win, Holmes received recognition as World Heavyweight Champion by The Ring.

Ali blamed his poor performance on thyroid medication which he had been taking, saying that it helped him lose weight (he weighed 217½, his lowest weight since he fought George Foreman in 1974), but it also left him drained for the fight.

Holmes seemed to show signs of sadness in punishing Ali so much during the fight. Tears appeared in Holmes' eyes during a post-fight interview. When asked why he was crying, he said that he respected Ali "a whole lot" and "he fought one of the baddest heavyweights in the world today, and you cannot take credit from him."

Holmes' trainer Richie Giachetti called Holmes' pummeling of Ali "awful...the worst sports event I ever had to cover." Actor Sylvester Stallone was ringside for the fight and said that it was like watching an autopsy on a man who is still alive. The Holmes fight is said to have contributed to Ali's Parkinson's syndrome.

Defeating Berbick, Leon Spinks & Snipes
After eight consecutive knockouts, Holmes was forced to go the distance when he successfully defended his title against future WBC Heavyweight Champion Trevor Berbick on April 11, 1981. In his next fight, two months later, Holmes knocked out former Undisputed World Heavyweight Champion Leon Spinks in three rounds. On November 6, 1981, Holmes rose from a seventh-round knockdown, during which he staggered into the turnbuckle, to stop Renaldo Snipes in the eleventh.

Defeating Cooney

On June 11, 1982, Holmes defended his title against Gerry Cooney, the undefeated #1 contender and an Irish-American. The lead-up to the fight had many racial overtones, with promoter Don King and others hyping Cooney as the "Great White Hope." Holmes said that if Cooney wasn't white, he would not be getting the same purse as the champion (both boxers received $10 million for the bout). Although Cooney tried to deflect questions about race, members of his camp wore shirts that said "Not the White Man, but the Right Man." In their fight previews, Sports Illustrated and Time put Cooney on the cover, not Holmes. Boxing tradition dictates that the champion be introduced last, but the challenger, Cooney, was introduced last.

The bout was held in a 32,000-seat stadium erected in a Caesar's Palace Parking lot, with millions more watching around the world. After an uneventful first round, Holmes dropped Cooney with a right in the second. Cooney came back well in the next two rounds, jarring Holmes with his powerful left hook. Holmes later said that Cooney "hit me so damned hard, I felt it—boom—in my bones." Cooney was tiring by the ninth, a round in which he had two points deducted for low blows. In the tenth, they traded punches relentlessly. At the end of the round, the two nodded to each other in respect. Cooney lost another point because of low blows in the eleventh. By then, Holmes was landing with ease. In the thirteenth, a barrage of punches sent Cooney down. He got up, but his trainer, Victor Valle, stepped into the ring and stopped the fight.

After the fight, Holmes and Cooney became close friends.

Trouble with the WBC
Holmes's next two fights were one-sided decision wins over Randall "Tex" Cobb and  ex-European champion  Lucien Rodriguez. On May 20, 1983, Holmes defended his title against Tim Witherspoon, the future WBC and WBA  Heavyweight Champion. Witherspoon, a six to one underdog and with only 15 professional bouts to his name, surprised many by giving Holmes a difficult fight. After twelve rounds, Holmes retained the title by a disputed split decision.

On September 10, 1983, Holmes successfully defended the WBC title for the sixteenth time, knocking out Scott Frank in five rounds. Holmes then signed to fight Marvis Frazier, son of Joe Frazier, on November 25, 1983. The WBC refused to sanction the fight against the unranked Frazier. They ordered Holmes to fight Greg Page, the #1 contender, or be stripped of the title. Promoter Don King offered Holmes $2.55 million to fight Page, but the champion didn't think that was enough. He was making $3.1 million to fight Frazier and felt he should get as much as $5 million to fight Page.

Holmes had an easy time with Frazier, knocking him out in the first round. The following month, Holmes relinquished the WBC championship.

IBF heavyweight champion
Despite his no longer being recognized by the WBC as champion, Holmes was still regarded as the lineal champion as well as being recognized as world champion by The Ring. On December 11, 1983, the newly formed International Boxing Federation extended recognition to Holmes, and he accepted.

As 1984 began, Holmes and Gerrie Coetzee, the WBA champion, were signed to unify the titles on June 15, 1984, at Caesars Palace. The fight was being promoted by JPD Inc., but it was canceled when Caesars Palace said the promoters failed to meet the financial conditions of the contract. Holmes was promised $13 million and Coetzee was promised $8 million. Even after cutting the purses dramatically, they still couldn't come up with enough financial backing to stage the fight. Don King then planned to promote the fight, but Holmes lost a lawsuit filed by Virginia attorney Richard Hirschfeld, who said he had a contract with Holmes that gave him right of first refusal on a Holmes-Coetzee bout. Holmes then decided to move on and fight someone else.

On November 9, 1984, after a year out of the ring, Holmes made his first defense of the IBF title, stopping James "Bonecrusher" Smith on a cut in the twelfth round. In the first half of 1985, Holmes stopped David Bey in ten rounds for his 19th title defense. His next against Carl "The Truth" Williams was unexpectedly tough. The younger, quicker Williams was able to out-jab the aging champion, who was left with a badly swollen eye by the end of the bout. Holmes emerged with a close, and disputed, fifteen-round unanimous decision.

Holmes vs. Michael Spinks 1 & 2
Holmes's next fight had the potential to make boxing history. He agreed to terms to fight Michael Spinks, the undisputed champion at light heavyweight, for his twentieth world title defense. A victory for Holmes would have tied Rocky Marciano's mark of 49 consecutive wins without a loss. Spinks, meanwhile, was looking to join Bob Fitzsimmons as the only other boxer at the time to win titles at both light heavyweight and heavyweight. In addition, if he defeated Holmes, Spinks would become the first ever reigning light heavyweight champion to win the heavyweight title.

Before the fight Archie Moore, the long-time light heavyweight champion who unsuccessfully challenged for the heavyweight crown himself twice, predicted an easy win for Holmes: "I'm afraid Larry will chew him up. Michael may be faster than Larry, but you can only go so fast." Despite the assessment, it indeed would be Spinks whose historical destiny would be fulfilled, as he defeated Holmes via unanimous decision to become the first reigning light heavyweight champion to win the heavyweight title. After the fight, a bitter Holmes said, "Rocky Marciano couldn't carry my jockstrap."

Holmes had a rematch with Spinks on April 19, 1986. Spinks retained the title with a disputed fifteen-round split decision. The judges scored the fight: Judge Joe Cortez 144–141 (Holmes), Judge Frank Brunette 141–144 (Spinks) and Judge Jerry Roth 142–144 (Spinks.) In a post-fight interview with HBO, Holmes said, "the judges, the referees and promoters can kiss me where the sun don't shine—and because we're on HBO, that's my big black behind."

On November 6, 1986, three days after his 37th birthday, Holmes announced his retirement.

Comebacks

 

On January 22, 1988, Holmes was lured out of retirement by a $2.8 million purse to challenge reigning Undisputed World Heavyweight Champion Mike Tyson. Tyson dropped Holmes in the fourth round with an overhand right. Holmes got up, but Tyson put him down two more times in the round, and the fight was stopped. It was the only time Holmes was knocked out in his career. After the fight, Holmes again retired.

Holmes returned to the ring in 1991 and became a much more active fighter, usually fighting on USA Tuesday Night Fights cards every few weeks against up and comers and journeymen. After five straight wins, he fought Ray Mercer, the undefeated 1988 Olympic Gold Medalist, on February 7, 1992. Holmes pulled off the upset and won by a 12-round unanimous decision. (Holmes later claimed that he fought Mercer in spite of having a detached retina.) The win got Holmes a shot at Evander Holyfield for the Undisputed World Heavyweight Championship. On June 19, 1992, Holyfield defeated Holmes by a twelve-round unanimous decision.

On April 8, 1995, he fought Oliver McCall for the WBC title. Holmes lost by a close 12-round unanimous decision. Two of the judges had him losing by one point, while the other judge had him losing by three points.

Holmes was back in the ring five months later, resuming the pace he had set since his comeback. However, he was growing tired of the sport and, after he fought and knocked out Anthony Willis in June 1996 on another USA boxing event, Holmes announced that unless he received a shot at the title, the fight against Willis was likely to be his last.

On January 24, 1997, Holmes got his last opportunity to fight for a heavyweight championship when he traveled to Copenhagen to fight undefeated International Boxing Organization champion Brian Nielsen. Nielsen won by a 12-round split decision to retain the title.

Holmes and George Foreman signed to fight on January 23, 1999, at the Astrodome in Houston. Foreman called off the fight several weeks before it was to take place because the promoter failed to meet the deadline for paying him the remaining $9 million of his $10 million purse. Foreman received a nonrefundable $1 million deposit, and Holmes got to keep a $400,000 down-payment of his $4 million purse.

Holmes's next two fights were rematches with old foes. On June 18, 1999, he stopped "Bonecrusher" Smith in eight rounds, and on November 17, 2000, he stopped Mike Weaver in six.

Holmes's final fight was on July 27, 2002, in Norfolk, Virginia in which he defeated Eric "Butterbean" Esch in a 10-round unanimous decision.

Post-boxing life
  
Holmes invested the money he earned from boxing and settled in his hometown of Easton. When he retired from boxing, Holmes employed more than 200 people through his various business holdings. In 2008, he owned two restaurants and a nightclub, a training facility, an office complex, a snack food bar and slot machines. Holmes currently co-hosts a talk show entitled What The Heck Were They Thinking?

In 2014, Holmes sold his business complex in Easton to entrepreneur Gerald Gorman, CEO of Lawyer.com.

In 2016, Holmes guest starred as himself in an episode of Mike Tyson Mysteries, titled "Unsolved Situations".

Honors
Holmes was inducted into the International Boxing Hall of Fame in 2008.

Personal life
In 1979, Larry Holmes married Diane Robinson, with whom he has had two children. He also has three daughters from two previous relationships. As of 2019, Holmes is living in Palmer Township, Pennsylvania, near Easton.

Holmes' younger brother, Mark Holmes, was a middleweight boxer from 1980 to 1987.

Professional boxing record

See also
List of heavyweight boxing champions
List of WBC world champions
List of IBF world champions
List of The Ring world champions

References

External links

Larry Holmes profile at International Boxing Hall of Fame
Larry Holmes profile at Cyber Boxing Zone
Larry Holmes profile at About.com, May 1, 2018
"Larry Holmes: 'Ali Was One of My Best Friends', BoxingInsider, January 8, 2016
Highlights of Holmes' 1980 defeat of Muhammad Ali

1949 births
Living people
20th-century African-American sportspeople
21st-century African-American people
African-American boxers
American male boxers
Boxers from Pennsylvania
International Boxing Federation champions
International Boxing Hall of Fame inductees
People from Cuthbert, Georgia
Sportspeople from Easton, Pennsylvania
The Ring (magazine) champions
World Boxing Council champions
World heavyweight boxing champions